Theogallin is a trihydroxybenzoic acid glycoside, a type of polyphenolic compound found in tea where it has been characterised as an umami enhancing compound. The compound can also be found in Arbutus unedo fruits.

In rats, theogallin, or its metabolite quinic acid, can move through the blood brain barrier and can have cognition enhancing activities.

References 

Quinic acid esters
Pyrogallols